This is a list of lieutenant generals in the Swedish Air Force since its formation in 1926. The grade of lieutenant general (or three-star general) is ordinarily the second-highest in the peacetime air force, ranking above major general and below general.

List of Swedish Air Force lieutenant generals
Entries are indexed by the numerical order in which each officer was appointed to that rank while on active duty, or by an asterisk (*) if the officer did not serve in that rank while on active duty. Each entry lists the officer's name, date of rank, date the officer vacated the active-duty rank, number of years on active duty as lieutenant general (Yrs), positions held as lieutenant general, and other biographical notes.

See also
Generallöjtnant
List of Swedish Navy lieutenant generals
List of Swedish Army lieutenant generals after 1900

Footnotes

References

Notes

Print

Lists of Swedish military personnel
Swedish Air Force